Jens Erik Kjeldsen (20 October 1890 – 22 February 1976) was a Danish cyclist. He competed in the team pursuit at the 1924 Summer Olympics.

References

External links
 

1890 births
1976 deaths
Danish male cyclists
Olympic cyclists of Denmark
Cyclists at the 1924 Summer Olympics
Cyclists from Copenhagen